Mordellistena humeronotata is a beetle in the genus Mordellistena of the family Mordellidae. It was described in 1922 by George Charles Champion.

References

humeronotata
Beetles described in 1922